Norbert Blüm (21 July 1935 – 23 April 2020) was a German politician who served as a federal legislator from North Rhine-Westphalia, chairman of the CDU North Rhine-Westphalia (1987–1999), and Minister of Labour and Social Affairs.

Blüm was the only cabinet member who served in his function for all sixteen years of Helmut Kohl's time as Chancellor of Germany. He served as a member of the Bundestag from 1972 to 1981 and again from 1983 to 2002. Blüm was part of the left wing of the conservative Christian Democratic Union (CDU).

Early life and education
Born in Rüsselsheim am Main, Blüm attended the Volksschule. In 1950, aged 15, Blüm joined the CDU. This year he also joined the IG Metall. That's why he often was nicknamed Herz-Jesu-Marxist. He trained and worked locally as a toolmaker for Opel from 1949 to 1957. He was engaged in the factory as a youth representative. During this time, he was a founding member of the local Boy Scouts affiliation, the Deutsche Pfadfinderschaft Sankt Georg. In 1961 he passed his Abitur at an Abendgymnasium in Mainz, thereby obtaining the university entrance qualification.

He studied German language and literature, history, philosophy and theology at the University of Bonn and University of Cologne until 1967. One of his teachers was Joseph Ratzinger. In 1967, he received his doctorate of philosophy (PhD) in Bonn with the dissertation Willenslehre und Soziallehre bei Ferdinand Tönnies. Ein Beitrag zum Verständnis von "Gemeinschaft und Gesellschaft".

Career
From 1977 to 1987 Blüm was chairman of the Christian Democratic Employees' Association. He was a member of the CDU federal executive committee from 1969 to 2000. He was chairman of the CDU of the state of North Rhine-Westphalia from 1987 to 1999.

Blüm was a member of the Bundestag for the CDU from 1972 to 1981 and from 1983 to 2002. From 1981 to 1982 he was Senator of Berlin. He was vice chairman of the federal CDU from 1981 to 1990 and again from 1992 to 2000.

Blüm was Federal Minister for Labour and Social Affairs  from 1982 to 1998. As minister, he was responsible for reforms and changes in the pension system. His greatest political success was the introduction of long-term care insurance (Pflegeversicherung) in 1995, after those reform plans were hotly and controversially debated in the Bundestag.

Political positions
Blüm adhered to Christian values and belonged to the left wing of the generally centre-right CDU. Blüm was strongly influenced by the Jesuit social philosopher Oswald von Nell-Breuning, one of the founders of the modern Catholic social teaching who lectured in Frankfurt. Nell-Breuning taught Blüm about the main three pillars "subsidiarity", "solidarity" and "charity".

During his time in office, Blüm held out and pushed back against demands by fellow CDU politicians to raise the federal retirement age from 65 to 70.

A popular quotation attributed to him is "Die Rente ist sicher" (loosely translated as: "Pensions are safe"), based on the governmental slogan he wielded in 1986: "Eins ist sicher: Die Rente" ("One thing is safe: pensions"). This quotation quickly gained notoriety in Germany and became a popular target for comedy, as well as a cynical reference that would be used by his opponents and critics for years to come.

The politician was a fervent supporter of human rights. On a trip to Chile in 1987, he accused former dictator Augusto Pinochet of torture.

Blüm once said that "politics is a struggle". "Whoever is in search of harmony must look for another profession. (...) But if you want to change something, you cannot please everybody."

Core issues of his politics were social justice and the fight against unemployment. For Blüm, "the little people" were important, which is why he tried to prevent a division of society into rich and poor with his politics. He saw social peace threatened by the Agenda 2010 that was later passed by the German government.

Blüm was an outspoken critic of Scientology. As a consequence, he was targeted by Scientology advocates, who would claim that the organization was a victim of religious discrimination in Germany.

Despite his good relationship with Helmut Kohl, Blüm criticized his handling of the CDU donations scandal.

After his departure from the Bundestag in 2002, he continued to comment on political issues publicly. Because of his criticism of Israel in the Middle East conflict, he was sometimes accused of antisemitism, which he rejected.

In 2016, he criticised the CDU's refugee policy because of the cold-hearted discussion about refugees. During the refugee crisis, the former minister visited the Greek refugee camp Idomeni in 2016 and heavily criticized the EU's treatment of refugees ("This kind of brutality is unworthy of European culture"). Out of solidarity he slept one night in the refugee camp.

In 2016 he opposed an unconditional basic income, on which Switzerland held a referendum at this time. It would be "unfair" and an "attempted escape from welfare state responsibility".

Personal life
Blüm married Marita Blüm (née Binger) in 1964. The couple had three children, a son and two daughters. Blüm was a practising Roman Catholic.

After blood poisoning in 2019, Blüm became paralysed in his arms and legs. He commented in a guest article for the German weekly Die Zeit in March 2020 about his new life in a wheelchair due to his paralysis, in which he compared his position to that of a puppet whose strings were pulled so that its parts dangled incoherently in the air: "Like a thief in the night, disaster broke into my life in the form of insidious blood poisoning".

Blüm died in Bonn on 23 April 2020.

Other activities
 Member of the Advisory Board of the Hans Böckler Prize of the City of Cologne
 Green Helmets, Member of the Board of Trustees
 Bonn Minster, Member of the Board of Trustees
 St. Maria zur Wiese, Member of the Board of Trustees
 IG Metall, Member (since 1949)

Awards 
 2000: Münchhausen Prize
 2001: Leipzig Human Rights Award
 2005: Leopold Kunschak Prize

Notes

References

External links 

 
 
 The 2001 Leipzig Human Rights Award, video coverage of the event at Xenu TV, 9 June 2001
 Kabinettsprotokolle Online "Blüm, Norbert" (in German) bundesarchiv.de

1935 births
2020 deaths
People from Rüsselsheim
Christian Democratic Union of Germany politicians
People from the People's State of Hesse
Labor ministers (Germany)
Social Affairs ministers of Germany
Members of the Bundestag for North Rhine-Westphalia
Members of the Bundestag 1998–2002
Members of the Bundestag 1994–1998
Members of the Bundestag 1990–1994
Members of the Bundestag 1987–1990
Members of the Bundestag 1983–1987
Members of the Bundestag 1980–1983
Members of the Bundestag 1976–1980
Members of the Bundestag 1972–1976
Members of the Bundestag for Rhineland-Palatinate
Senators of Berlin
University of Bonn alumni
Grand Crosses with Star and Sash of the Order of Merit of the Federal Republic of Germany